Grant Thomas Thornton (born 29 August 1992) is an English cricketer. He made his List A debut for Warwickshire in the 2017 Royal London One-Day Cup on 27 April 2017. He made his first-class debut for Warwickshire in the 2017 County Championship on 19 May 2017.

References

External links
 

1992 births
Living people
English cricketers
Warwickshire cricketers
Cricketers from Coventry